Aerotropolis is the second studio album by electro-musician Ikonika. It was released in July 2013 under Hyperdub

Track listing

References

2013 albums
Hyperdub albums